Cordell–Lorenz Observatory (850) is an astronomical observatory owned and operated by Sewanee:The University of the South. It is located in Sewanee, Tennessee, United States.

The Observatory has an 1897 vintage 6 inch Alvan Clark refractor located in the main dome and several other telescopes that feature apertures between 3.5 and 12.5 inches. Public observation sessions are held on Thursdays from 8pm to 10pm when the University is in session, meaning from mid-August to mid-December and from mid-January to mid-May.

List of discovered minor planets

See also 
 E. S. Beeson
 List of asteroid-discovering observatories
 List of astronomical observatories

References

External links 
 Discoveries and Observations from the Cordell–Lorenz Observatory

Astronomical observatories in Tennessee
Buildings and structures in Franklin County, Tennessee
Education in Franklin County, Tennessee
Minor-planet discovering observatories
Sewanee: The University of the South